These are the Billboard magazine number-one albums of 1958, per the Billboard chart Best-Selling Pop LPs.

Chart history

See also
1958 in music
List of number-one albums (United States)

References

1958